The Cessna Model CW-6 was a 1920s American six-seat touring aircraft built by the Cessna Aircraft Company.

Design and development
Following development of the four-seat Model A the company designed a six-seat aircraft, the Model CW-6. The aircraft first flew in November 1928, powered by a 220 hp (164 kW) Wright Whirlwind J-5 radial engine. The aircraft was displayed at the 1929 Auto Show in Wichita, Kansas. A scaled-down four-seat version, the Cessna DC-6, was also developed.

Specifications (CW-6)

References

CW-06
Single-engined tractor aircraft
1920s United States civil utility aircraft
High-wing aircraft
Vehicles introduced in 1928
Aircraft first flown in 1928